Lizandra González Moya (born 21 July 1998) is a Cuban footballer who plays as a midfielder for the Cuba women's national team.

International career
González capped for Cuba at senior level during the 2018 CONCACAF Women's Championship (and its qualification).

References

1998 births
Living people
Cuban women's footballers
Women's association football midfielders
FC Villa Clara players
Cuba women's international footballers
21st-century Cuban women